Streeter John Seidell (born December 2, 1982) is an American comedian, writer, actor, and TV host. Seidell was part of the cast of CollegeHumor's online sketches.  His video series Prank Wars was viewed tens of millions of times, which eventually led to a TV-series called Pranked on MTV with fellow CollegeHumor editor, Amir Blumenfeld.

Starting in 2013, Seidell began writing for the ABC sitcom Trophy Wife. In 2014, Seidell joined the writing staff of the NBC variety show Saturday Night Live. In 2022, he was promoted to head writer.

Education and background
He has a sister, Heidi. Seidell graduated from Fordham University in 2005 with a B.A. in communications. Seidell started dating Vanessa Bone while they were in high school. They married on September 16, 2011.

Career

CollegeHumor.com
Seidell was hired to work for CollegeHumor.com in 2004 as one of the original line-up of staff for the site. He was in charge of editing the site's front page. He also wrote for the Hardly Working series. Seidell's characters are now under the name Streeter Theeter.

The CollegeHumor Show
The Hardly Working series was adapted into a TV sitcom format by MTV. It portrays the usual Hardly Working style of comedy, in which the staff acts out fictionalized versions of themselves in their usual office in New York. The show premiered on February 9, 2009. The show was not picked up for a second season.

Saturday Night Live
Seidell was hired as a writer by Saturday Night Live in 2014 and promoted to supervising writer in 2017, and then head writer in early 2022. His writing partner on SNL is Mikey Day. Sketches of note include the "Close Encounter" series with Kate McKinnon, 
the "Poolboy" series with Pete Davidson and "Haunted Elevator (ft. David S. Pumpkins)" with Tom Hanks.

Disney
Seidell and Day have two projects in development for Disney with one already released. A sixth film in the Home Alone franchise titled Home Sweet Home Alone was released exclusively on Disney+ on November 12, 2021. A live-action Inspector Gadget film is in pre-production, as well as a SpaceCamp remake produced by Walt Disney Pictures.

Other appearances and projects
In the short film The Old Man and the Seymour, Seidell plays Seymour Plunkett, an orphan who gets adopted by his hormonal deficient uncle (Amir Blumenfeld) after his dad dies. Seidell is featured on the History Channel show I Love the 1880s, where he, along with many other comedians, provides humorous commentary to historical facts and trivia.

Seidell wrote White Whine: A Study of First World Problems. Published on October 1, 2013, the book consists of chapters detailing various luxuries, and why the people who complain about them in a certain way are considered White Whiners, each ending with a few social networking posts by said Whiners.

Seidell launched his podcast, The Talk of Shame Show on May 15, 2014. The podcast has a guest every week to discuss shameful stories of their past, and also includes a fan submitted story. The show has had several other CollegeHumor writers on it, such as Jake Hurwitz, Amir Blumenfeld, and Dan Gurewitch.

Seidell has also written for the New York Times, Mental Floss, Metro NY and Men's Fitness. He also co-wrote the book, The CollegeHumor Guide to College: Selling Kidneys for Beer Money, Sleeping with Your Professors, Majoring in Communications, and Other Really Good Ideas, along with the other CollegeHumor writers and editors. Seidell was also a writer for the ABC sitcom Trophy Wife.

References

External links

 Streeter's personal website 
 
 Streeter Seidell on CollegeHumor.com

1982 births
CollegeHumor people
Living people
American stand-up comedians
Writers from New Haven, Connecticut
21st-century American comedians